The Revolving Door is a 1968 American short documentary film directed by Lee R. Bobker and produced by Vision Associates. The 28.5 minute film was nominated for an Academy Award for Best Documentary Short.

See also
 Psychiatric Nursing
 The Odds Against

References

External links

1968 films
1968 documentary films
1960s short documentary films
American short documentary films
Documentary films about incarceration in the United States
Films directed by Lee R. Bobker
1960s English-language films
1960s American films